State Road 262 (SR 262) is a state road in the south-eastern section of the state of Indiana. SR 262 was originally introduced in the early-1930s routed between along its modern routing. The road was paved in the mid to late 1960s. The road serves as the eastern terminus of its primary route, Indiana 62 just east of Dillsboro.

Route description

SR 262 begins at US 50 near Dillsboro in Dearborn County.  Going south, it crosses SR 62 after only a few hundred feet, then runs southeast.  After a few miles, it descends into the Laughery Creek Valley, crossing the creek into Ohio County. After turning eastward and passing through the unincorporated community of Milton, it ascends out of the valley. Both the approach and departure of the valley are fairly hazardous, with sharp curves and steep dropoffs. At about 7 miles, it reaches the top of the ridge, where the road straightens out for a distance of a mile. The western end of this stretch is marked by a four-way intersection in the unincorporated community of Pate, with Hartford Pike headed north, while Cass-Union Road heading south to SR 56 in Aberdeen. SR 262 then passes through a four-way stop in Cofield Corner with Salem Ridge Road headed north east, and Palmer Road headed south. The road then descends into the Arnold Creek Valley, which is also a curvy stretch of road, but lacks the steep dropoffs of the Laughery Creek section.  The road enters the town of Rising Sun following Main Street, passing through a residential area of town. SR 262 terminates at an intersection between Main Street and High Street (SR 56) in the town. SR 56 turns onto Main Street for one block, before turning south and continuing towards Vevay and Madison. Indiana Department of Transportation surveys in 2015 showed that the highest traffic levels along SR 262 were the 3,352 vehicles daily in the Rising Sun; the lowest count was 514 vehicles per day in the area of Hartford Pike.

History 
The Indiana State Highway Commission designated SR 262 in 1932. The original routing started at US 50 in Dillsboro and ran southeast to SR 56 in Rising Sun much as it does today. The entire route of SR 262 was paved between 1966 and 1967. The last major change to SR 262 happen between 1969 and 1970 and it was a short addition north to the new four-lane US 50 in Dillsboro. The routing has remained unchanged since

Major intersections

References

External links

 Indiana Highway Ends - SR 262

262
Transportation in Dearborn County, Indiana
Transportation in Ohio County, Indiana